High school of Electronics "Aleksandar Stepanovich Popov" is a high school in Veliko Tarnovo, Bulgaria.

History 
The school was founded in 1964 due to a need in electronics specialists in Veliko Tarnovo.

References 

Schools in Bulgaria
Educational institutions established in 1964
Education in Veliko Tarnovo
Buildings and structures in Veliko Tarnovo
1964 establishments in Bulgaria